Luperus is a genus of skeletonizing leaf beetle belonging to the family Chrysomelidae, subfamily Galerucinae.

Genera
European species within this genus include:
 Luperus abdominalis Rosenhauer, 1856
 Luperus aetolicus Kiesenwetter, 1861
 Luperus alpicus Desbrochers, 1898
 Luperus armeniacus Kiesenwetter, 1878
 Luperus biraghii Ragusa, 1871
 Luperus calabricus Laboissière, 1911
 Luperus circassicus Medvedev, 1962
 Luperus cyanipennis Küster, 1848
 Luperus fiorii Weise, 1895
 Luperus flaviceps Apfelbeck, 1912
 Luperus flavipennis Lucas, 1849
 Luperus flavipennis flavus Rosenhauer, 1856
 Luperus flavipes (Linnaeus, 1767)
 Luperus floralis Faldermann, 1837
 Luperus graecus Weise, 1886
 Luperus kiesenwetteri Joannis, 1865
 Luperus kiritshenkoi Ogloblin, 1936
 Luperus leonardii Fogato, 1979
 Luperus longicornis (Fabricius, 1781)
 Luperus luperus (Sulzer, 1776)
 Luperus maculicornis Desbrochers, 1872
 Luperus nigripes Kiessenwetter, 1861
 Luperus pygmaeus Joannis, 1865
 Luperus pyrenaeus Germar, 1824
 Luperus ragusai Laboissière, 1919
 Luperus revelierei Perris, 1864
 Luperus rhilensis Weise, 1900
 Luperus rugifrons Weise, 1886
 Luperus saxonicus (Gmellin, 1790)
 Luperus sulphuripes Graells, 1858
 Luperus viridipennis Germar, 1824
 Luperus vitalei Ragusa, 1923
 Luperus xanthopoda (Schrank, 1781)

References

Galerucinae
Chrysomelidae genera
Beetles of Europe
Taxa named by Étienne Louis Geoffroy